Dromara is a civil parish in County Down, Northern Ireland. It is situated in the historic baronies of Iveagh Upper, Lower Half, Iveagh Lower, Lower Half and Kinelarty.

Settlements
The civil parish contains the following settlements:
Dromara

Townlands
Dromara civil parish contains the following townlands:

Ardtanagh
Aughnaskeagh
Ballykine
Begny
Burren
Clontanagullion
Crossgar
Derry
Dooglen
Dree
Drin
Dromara
Drumadoney
Drumgavlin
Drumkeeragh
Dunbeg Lower
Dunbeg Upper
Dunmore
Edendarriff
Finnis
Gransha
Guiness
Levallyreagh
Moneynabane
Moybrick Lower
Moybrick Upper
Moydalgan
Mullaghdrin

See also
List of civil parishes of County Down

References